Ets variant 3 is a protein that in humans is encoded by the ETV3 gene.

References

Further reading